Desulfobacter latus is a sulfate-reducing bacteria, with type strain AcRS2.

References

Further reading

External links

LPSN
Type strain of Desulfobacter latus at BacDive -  the Bacterial Diversity Metadatabase

Desulfobacterales
Bacteria described in 1988